Brad or Bradley Smith may refer to:

Sportspeople 
Bradley Smith (cricketer) (born 1969), English former cricketer
Brad Smith (footballer, born 1948), Australian rules footballer and premiership coach of East Fremantle
Brad Smith (ice hockey) (born 1958), Canadian ice hockey player
Brad Smith (soccer, born 1965), American soccer player
Brad Smith (racing driver) (born 1968), American stock car racing driver
Brad Smith (footballer, born 1977), Australian rules footballer, ruckman from Claremont
Brad Smith (footballer, born 1979), Australian rules footballer for Subiaco
Brad Smith (American football) (born 1983), American football player
Brad Smith (Canadian football) (born 1983), Canadian football player
Bradley Smith (motorcyclist) (born 1990), British motorcyclist
Bradley Smith (racing driver) (born 1991), British racing driver
Brad Smith (soccer, born 1994), Australian international soccer player for D.C. United
Brad Smith (Scottish footballer) (born 1997), Scottish footballer for Dundee United F.C.

Other people
Bradley Smith (photographer) (1910–1997), American magazine photographer, writer, and photojournalist
Bradley Smith (Holocaust denier) (1930–2016)
Bradley Smith (law professor) (born 1958), political scientist and former Federal Election Commission chairman
Brad Smith (American lawyer) (born 1959), president and chief legal officer of Microsoft
Brad Smith (entrepreneur) (born 1987), Australian entrepreneur, founder of Braaap
Brad D. Smith, former CEO of Intuit, Inc., president of Marshall University

See also
Brad Smyth (born 1973), Canadian ice hockey player
Braydon Smith (1991–2015), nicknamed Brayd, Australian boxer